Oumar Yaya Mahamat, known as Modou Kouta is a Chadian former international football player and football manager. From September 2011 to December 2013 he coached Chad national football team.

Mahamat, returned as coach of Chad in 2015, taking control of matches against Egypt in November 2015.

References

External links

Year of birth missing (living people)
Gazelle FC
Living people
Chadian footballers
Chadian football managers
Chad national football team managers
Place of birth missing (living people)
Association football midfielders